Elachista ciliigera is a moth of the family Elachistidae. It is found in the United States, where it has been recorded from Mississippi.

References

ciliigera
Moths described in 1996
Moths of North America